João Manuel Pires (born 10 June 1979, in São João de Lobrigos) is a former Portuguese middle distance runner who specialized in the 800 metres and 1500 metres. He competed at the 2000 and 2004 Summer Olympics failing to advance to the final. He managed to reach the semifinals at the 2003 World Championships in Paris.

Competition record

Personal bests
Outdoor
400 metres – 48.72 (2001)
800 metres – 1:45.59 (Zürich 2000)
1000 metres – 2:21.33 (Lisbon2004)
1500 metres – 3:42.66 (Braga 2001)

Indoor
800 metres – 1:47.33 (Stuttgart 2002)
1500 metres – 3:41.17 (Espinho 2004)

References
IAAF profile

1979 births
Living people
Portuguese male middle-distance runners
Olympic athletes of Portugal
Athletes (track and field) at the 2000 Summer Olympics
Athletes (track and field) at the 2004 Summer Olympics